"Magic Doors" is the third single from English trip hop band Portishead's third studio album, Third. It was released on 24 November 2008 through Island Records. The music video for the song is an artistic film by longtime collaborator John Minton.

Remix 
DJ Green Lantern produced the official remix to the song, known as a Green Lantern remix, that features Linkin Park co-lead vocalist Mike Shinoda and the Los Angeles underground rap duo Styles of Beyond. It was released a month later in December 2008.

Live performances 
Portishead performed the song live on current TV, which is featured as a UK digital download bonus track from their third studio album Third in April 2008.

Track listing

12"
"Magic Doors" – 3:32

Digital Download
The videos for "Silence", "Threads" and "Mysterons" were recorded during Portishead's performance at the 2008 Coachella Valley Music and Arts Festival.
"Magic Doors" (Single Edit) – 3:22
"Silence" (video) – 4:23
"Threads" (video) – 5:48
"Mysterons" (video) – 5:35

Charts

References

External links
Official site

2008 singles
Portishead (band) songs
Songs written by Geoff Barrow
Songs written by Beth Gibbons
2008 songs